Greece competed as the host nation of the 2004 Summer Paralympics in Athens, Greece. The team included 124 athletes, 107 men and 17 women. Competitors from Greece won 20 medals, including 3 gold, 13 silver and 4 bronze to finish 34th in the medal table.

Medalists

Sports

Archery

Men

|-
|align=left|Romaios Roumeliotis
|align=left|Men's individual standing
|469
|22
|L 116-147
|colspan=5|did not advance
|}

Women

|-
|align=left|Anna Tzika
|align=left|Women's individual standing
|549
|7
|
|W 130-128
|L 91-101
|colspan=3|did not advance
|}

Athletics

Men's track

Men's field

Women's track

Women's field

Boccia

Cycling

Men's road

Men's track

Equestrian

Football 5-a-side
The men's football 5-a-side team didn't win any medals, they defeated by Spain in the bronze medal match.

Players
Georgios Alikaniotis
Dimitris Ampatzis
Paschalis Ampatzis
Angelis Aslanoglou
Estratios Chatziapostolidis
Christoforos Katsampalis
Ioannis Papnikolaou
Charalampos Tokatlidis
Argyrios Triantafyllou
Dimos Zacharos

Tournament

Goalball
The men's goalball team didn't win any medals, they were 12th out of 12 teams.

Players
Nikolaos Argyros
Athanasios Chasiotis
Nikolaos Chatzidafnis
Antonios Diamantopoulos
Sotirios Michalpoulos
Anastasios Trikalitis

Men's tournament

The women's goalball team didn't win any medals, they were knocked out in the preliminaries.

Players
Antigoni Chatziapostolidou
Vouziana Giota
Styliani Iliopoulou
Aikaterini Lorentzou
Maria Tzalla
Ioanna Zacharou

Women's tournament

Judo

Men

Women

Powerlifting

Men

Women

Sailing

Shooting

Men

Women

Swimming

Men

Women

Table tennis

Men

Volleyball
The men's volleyball team didn't win any medals, they were 8th out of 8 teams.

Players
Marinos Anagnostopoulos
Emmanouil Drakonakis
Christos Konstantakopoulos
Anastasios Kostaris
Eleftherios Lamprakis
Kyriakos Makris
Nikolaos Mallios
Ioannis Somos
Ioannis Soukiouroglou
Emmanouil Touloupakis
Panagiotis Vakondios
Georgios Zafeiropoulos

Men's tournament

Wheelchair basketball
The men's team didn't any medals, they were 12th out of 12 teams.

Players
Michalis Chatzidimitriou
Panagiotis Chrisovergis
Angelos Dimpitouzis
Georgios Echlert
Vaios Gioras
Georgios Kounias
Nikolaos Loulas
Athanasios Maltas
Georgios Petrakis
Michalis Stergiopoulous
Periklis Tsapanidis
Angelos Tsiakiris

Men's tournament

Wheelchair fencing

Wheelchair tennis

Men

See also
Greece at the Paralympics
Greece at the 2004 Summer Olympics

References 

Nations at the 2004 Summer Paralympics
2004
Summer Paralympics